In an area of mathematics called differential topology, an exotic sphere is a differentiable manifold M that is homeomorphic but not diffeomorphic to the standard Euclidean n-sphere. That is, M is a sphere from the point of view of all its topological properties, but carrying a smooth structure that is not the familiar one (hence the name "exotic").

He showed that there are at least 7 differentiable structures on the 7-sphere. In any dimension  showed that the diffeomorphism classes of oriented exotic spheres form the non-trivial elements of an abelian monoid under connected sum, which is a finite abelian group if the dimension is not 4. The classification of exotic spheres by  showed that the oriented exotic 7-spheres are the non-trivial elements of a cyclic group of order 28 under the operation of connected sum.

Introduction
The unit n-sphere, is the set of all (n+1)-tuples  of real numbers, such that the sum . For instance,  is a circle, while  is the surface of an ordinary ball of radius one in 3 dimensions. Topologists consider a space, X, to be an n-sphere if there is a homeomorphism between them, i.e. every point in X may be assigned to exactly one point in the unit n-sphere in a bicontinuous (i.e. continuous and invertible with continuous inverse) manner. Similarly, an n-cube of any radius can be continuously transformed to an n-sphere.

In differential topology, the relevant notion of sameness is witnessed by a diffeomorphism, which is a strict generalization of a homeomorphism. In particular, a more stringent condition is added requiring that the functions matching points in X with points in  should be smooth, that is they should have derivatives of all orders everywhere. To calculate derivatives, one needs to have local coordinate systems defined consistently in X. Mathematicians were surprised in 1956 when Milnor showed that consistent coordinate systems could be set up on the 7-sphere in two different ways that were equivalent in the continuous sense, but not in the differentiable sense. Milnor and others set about trying to discover how many such exotic spheres could exist in each dimension and to understand how they relate to each other. No exotic structures are possible on the 1-, 2-, 3-, 5-, 6-, 12-, 56- or 61-spheres. Some higher-dimensional spheres have only two possible differentiable structures, others have thousands. Whether exotic 4-spheres exist, and if so how many, is an unsolved problem.

Classification
The monoid of smooth structures on n-spheres is the collection of oriented smooth n-manifolds which are homeomorphic to the n-sphere, taken up to orientation-preserving diffeomorphism.  The monoid operation is the connected sum. Provided ,  this monoid is a group and is isomorphic to the group   of h-cobordism classes of oriented homotopy n-spheres, which is finite and abelian. In dimension 4 almost nothing is known about the monoid of smooth spheres, beyond the facts that it is finite or countably infinite, and abelian, though it is suspected to be infinite; see the section on Gluck twists. All homotopy n-spheres are homeomorphic to the n-sphere by the generalized Poincaré conjecture, proved by Stephen Smale in dimensions bigger than 4, Michael Freedman in dimension 4, and Grigori Perelman in dimension 3. In dimension 3, Edwin E. Moise proved that every topological manifold has an essentially unique smooth structure (see Moise's theorem), so the monoid of smooth structures on the 3-sphere is trivial.

Parallelizable manifolds
The group   has a cyclic subgroup

represented by n-spheres that bound parallelizable manifolds.

are described separately in the paper , which was influential in the development of surgery theory. In fact, these calculations can be formulated in a modern language in terms of the surgery exact sequence as indicated here.

The group  is a cyclic group, and is trivial or order 2 except in case , in which case it can be large, with its order related to the Bernoulli numbers. It is trivial if n is even. If n is 1 mod 4 it has order 1 or 2; in particular it has order 1 if n is 1, 5,  13,  29, or 61, and  proved that it has order 2 if  mod 4 is not of the form . It follows from the now almost completely resolved Kervaire invariant problem that it has order 2 for all n bigger than 126; the case  is still open.

(The formula in the topological literature differs slightly because topologists use a different convention for naming Bernoulli numbers; this article uses the number theorists' convention.)

Map between quotients
The quotient group  has a description in terms of stable homotopy groups of spheres modulo the image of the J-homomorphism; it is either equal to the quotient or index 2. More precisely there is an injective map

where  is the nth stable homotopy group of spheres, and J is the image of the J-homomorphism. The quotient group  is the "hard" part of the stable homotopy groups of spheres, and accordingly  is the hard part of the exotic spheres, but almost completely reduces to computing homotopy groups of spheres. The map is either an isomorphism (the image is the whole group), or an injective map with index 2. The latter is the case if and only if there exists an n-dimensional framed manifold with Kervaire invariant 1, which is known as the Kervaire invariant problem. Thus a factor of 2 in the classification of exotic spheres depends on the Kervaire invariant problem.

, the Kervaire invariant problem is almost completely solved, with only the case  remaining open; see that article for details. Manifolds with Kervaire invariant 1 have been constructed in dimension 2, 6, 14, 30, and 62, but dimension 126 is open, with no manifold being either constructed or disproven.

Order of Θn

{| class="wikitable" style="text-align:center"
|-
! Dim  n !! 1 !! 2 !! 3 !! 4 !! 5 !! 6 !! 7 !! 8 !! 9 !! 10 !! 11 !! 12 !! 13 !! 14 !! 15 !! 16 !! 17 !! 18 !! 19 !! 20
|-
! order 
| 1 || 1 || 1 || 1 || 1 || 1 || 28 || 2 || 8 || 6 || 992 || 1 || 3 || 2 || 16256 || 2 || 16 || 16 || 523264 || 24
|-
!
| 1 || 1 || 1 || 1 || 1 || 1 || 28 || 1 || 2 || 1 || 992 || 1 || 1 || 1 || 8128 || 1 || 2 || 1 || 261632 || 1
|-
!
| 1 || 1 || 1 || 1 || 1 || 1 || 1 || 2 || 2×2 || 6 || 1 || 1 || 3 || 2 || 2 || 2 || 2×2×2 || 8×2 || 2 || 24
|-
! 
| 1 || 2 || 1 || 1 || 1 || 2 || 1 || 2 || 2×2 || 6 || 1 || 1 || 3 || 2×2 || 2 || 2 || 2×2×2 || 8×2 || 2 || 24
|-
!index
| – || 2 || – || – || – || 2 || – || – || – || – || – || – || – || 2 || – || – || – || – || – || –
|}

Further entries in this table can be computed from the information above together with the table of stable homotopy groups of spheres.

Explicit examples of exotic spheres

Milnor's construction 

Milnor showed that it is not the boundary of any smooth 8-manifold with vanishing 4th Betti number, and has no orientation-reversing diffeomorphism to itself; either of these properties implies that it is not a standard 7-sphere. Milnor showed that this manifold has a Morse function with just two critical points, both non-degenerate, which implies that it is topologically a sphere.

Brieskorn spheres 

with a small sphere around the origin for  gives all 28 possible smooth structures on the oriented 7-sphere. Similar manifolds are called Brieskorn spheres.

Twisted spheres
Given an (orientation-preserving) diffeomorphism , gluing the boundaries of two copies of the standard disk  together by f yields a manifold called a twisted sphere (with twist f). It is homotopy equivalent to the standard n-sphere because the gluing map is homotopic to the identity (being an orientation-preserving diffeomorphism, hence degree 1), but not in general diffeomorphic to the standard sphere. 
Setting  to be the group of twisted n-spheres (under connect sum), one obtains the exact sequence

For , every exotic n-sphere is diffeomorphic to a twisted sphere, a result proven by Stephen Smale which can be seen as a consequence of the h-cobordism theorem. (In contrast, in the piecewise linear setting the left-most map is onto via radial extension: every piecewise-linear-twisted sphere is standard.) The group  of twisted spheres is always isomorphic to the group .

In 1970 Jean Cerf proved the pseudoisotopy theorem which implies that  is the trivial group provided , and so  provided .

Applications
If M is a piecewise linear manifold then the problem of finding the compatible smooth structures on M depends on knowledge of the groups . More precisely, the obstructions to the existence of any smooth structure lie in the groups  for various values of k, while if such a smooth structure exists then all such smooth structures can be  classified using the groups .
In particular the groups Γk vanish if , so all PL manifolds of dimension at most 7 have a smooth structure, which is essentially unique if the manifold has dimension at most 6.

The following finite abelian groups are essentially the same:
The group Θn of h-cobordism classes of oriented homotopy n-spheres.
The group  of h-cobordism classes of oriented n-spheres.
The group  Γn of twisted oriented n-spheres.
The homotopy group n(PL/DIFF)
If , the homotopy group n(TOP/DIFF) (if  this group has order 2; see Kirby–Siebenmann invariant).
The group of smooth structures of an oriented PL n-sphere.
If , the group of smooth structures of an oriented topological n-sphere.
If , the group of components of the group of all orientation-preserving diffeomorphisms of Sn−1.

4-dimensional exotic spheres and Gluck twists
In 4 dimensions it is not known whether there are any exotic smooth structures on the 4-sphere. The statement that they do not exist is known as the "smooth Poincaré conjecture", and is discussed by  who say that it is believed to be false.

Some candidates proposed for exotic 4-spheres are the Cappell–Shaneson spheres and those derived by Gluck twists . Gluck twist spheres are constructed by cutting out a tubular neighborhood of a 2-sphere S in S4 and gluing it back in using a diffeomorphism of its boundary S2×S1. The result is always homeomorphic to S4. Many cases over the years were ruled out as possible counterexamples to the smooth 4 dimensional Poincaré conjecture. For example, .

See also
Milnor's sphere
Atlas (topology)
Clutching construction
Exotic R4
Cerf theory
Seven-dimensional space

References

 This book describes Brieskorn's work relating exotic spheres to singularities of complex manifolds.
 – This paper describes the structure of the group of smooth structures on an n-sphere for n > 4. The promised paper "Groups of Homotopy Spheres: II" never appeared, but Levine's lecture notes contain the material which it might have been expected to contain.

.

.
 .

External links 
Exotic spheres on the Manifold Atlas
Exotic sphere home page on the home page of Andrew Ranicki. Assorted source material relating to exotic spheres.
An animation of exotic 7-spheres Video from a presentation by Niles Johnson at the Second Abel conference in honor of John Milnor.
The Gluck construction on the Manifold Atlas

Differential topology
Differential structures
Surgery theory
Spheres